Kim Jin-soon (born 5 September 1968) is a South Korean fencer. She competed in the women's foil events at the 1988 and 1992 Summer Olympics.

References

1968 births
Living people
South Korean female fencers
Olympic fencers of South Korea
Fencers at the 1988 Summer Olympics
Fencers at the 1992 Summer Olympics
Asian Games medalists in fencing
Fencers at the 1990 Asian Games
Asian Games silver medalists for South Korea
Medalists at the 1990 Asian Games
20th-century South Korean women